The Yuhua Single Member Constituency is a single member constituency (SMC) located in the western area of Singapore. The ward covers the area of Yuhua and Parts of the Jurong Gateway District. The current Member of Parliament is Grace Fu of the People's Action Party (PAP).

Town Council

Yuhua SMC, along with Jurong GRC & Bukit Batok SMC, is managed by the Jurong-Clementi Town Council.

Members of Parliament

Electoral results

Elections in 1980s

Elections in 1990s

Elections in 2010s

Elections in 2020s

References

Singaporean electoral divisions